The following is the list of squads for each of the 23 teams that competed in the 1948 Summer Olympics, held in United Kingdom between 30 July and 13 August 1948. Each team selected a squad of 12 players for the tournament.

Group A

Brazil

The following players represented Brazil:

Canada

The following players represented Canada:

Great Britain

The following players represented Great Britain:

Hungary

The following players represented Hungary:

Italy

The following players represented Italy:

Uruguay

The following players represented Uruguay:

Group B

Belgium

The following players represented Belgium:

Chile

The following players represented Chile:

Republic of China

The following players represented the Republic of China:

Iraq

The following players represented Iraq:

Philippines

The following players represented the Philippines:

South Korea

The following players represented South Korea:

Group C

Argentina

The following players represented Argentina:

Czechoslovakia

The following players represented Czechoslovakia:

Egypt

The following players represented Egypt:

Peru

The following players represented Peru:

Switzerland

The following players represented Switzerland:

United States

The following players represented the United States:

Group D

Cuba

The following players represented Cuba:

France

The following players represented France:

Iran

The following players represented Iran:

Ireland

The following players represented Ireland:

Mexico

The following players represented Mexico:

References

External links
1948 Olympic Games 

1948 Summer Olympics